Patrick Anthony Kudla (born April 2, 1996) is a Canadian professional ice hockey player. He currently plays for the Idaho Steelheads in the ECHL.

Playing career
Kudla was born and raised in Guelph, Ontario, where he played for the Guelph Hurricanes in the GOJHL from the 2012–13 season through to the 2014–15 season. In 2016, he was drafted 158th overall by the Arizona Coyotes in the National Hockey League, but never played in the league. During the 2017–18 season, he played for the University of Guelph ice hockey team. 

After his season with the University of Guelph, he moved to Europe to play for HC Nové Zámky in the Slovak Extraliga. From here, during the 2019–20 season, he was drafted to HC Frýdek-Místek in the Czech Chance Liga, then subsequently to HC Litvínov in the Czech Extraliga, where he played 62 games across two seasons. In 2021, he returned to the Slovak Extraliga to play for HK Dukla Trenčín. In the 2022 season, he returned to North America to play for the Idaho Steelheads in the ECHL

Career statistics

References

External links

1996 births
Living people
Arizona Coyotes draft picks
Canadian ice hockey defencemen
Colorado Eagles players
Dubuque Fighting Saints players
HC Frýdek-Místek players
HC Litvínov players
HK Dukla Trenčín players
HC Nové Zámky players
Ice hockey people from Ontario
Idaho Steelheads (ECHL) players
Sportspeople from Guelph
Tucson Roadrunners players
University of Guelph alumni
Canadian expatriate ice hockey players in the Czech Republic
Canadian expatriate ice hockey players in the United States
Canadian expatriate ice hockey players in Slovakia